KUCD (101.9 FM) is a  modern rock-formatted radio station serving Honolulu, Hawaii. The  outlet broadcasts with an effective radiated power (ERP) of 100 kW and is licensed to Pearl City, Hawaii. It also transmits on Charter Spectrum digital cable channel 853 for the entire state of Hawaii.  Its studios are located in the Kalihi neighborhood of Honolulu, while its transmitter is located near Akupu.

History
KUCD started broadcasting in 1991 as a smooth jazz station as "CD 101.9". On August 29, 1997, at 3 p.m., it switched to modern AC as "Star 101.9." It further evolved towards modern rock in 2001. This lasted until 2009, when it shifted back to modern AC; with this format change, KUCD changed its positioner from "Hawaii's New Music Alternative" to "90's, 2K, and Today". In early 2011, KUCD reverted to the modern rock format, albeit with a slight modern AC lean, using their previous "Hawaii's New Music Alternative" slogan once again. A few months after this, KUCD dropped the modern AC lean, and is once again a modern rock station.

In 2013, the station changed its positioner to "Hawaii's Alternative". With the May 2020 format flip of KPOI from alternative to soft AC, KUCD is now the only radio station in Honolulu playing alternative rock music. KUCD's HD2 sub-channel airs Asian Pop formatted PoP! 99.1 at 101.9-2 and on the iHeartRadio app.

See also
1991 in radio

References

External links
KUCD official website

 HD2 translator

UCD
Modern rock radio stations in the United States
Radio stations established in 1991
IHeartMedia radio stations
1991 establishments in Hawaii